

The Bede BD-6 is a single-seat light aircraft first flown in the United States in 1974. Similar in design to the Bede BD-4, it is a high-wing cantilever monoplane of conventional configuration. The BD-6 is marketed as a kit homebuilt.

The prototype was damaged in St Louis in the Great Flood of 1993, but in 2005 was reportedly under restoration by Bedecorp.  The company created new drawings to finally bring the design to market. By 2011 kits were for sale for US$13,000 and two aircraft had been flown.

Specifications (prototype)

References

 Fricker, J. "The Mighty Hirth: Out of the Cold and Into the Blue". Flying (September 1973).
 
 
 
 Manufacturer's website

BD-006
1970s United States civil utility aircraft
Single-engined tractor aircraft
High-wing aircraft
Homebuilt aircraft
Aircraft first flown in 1974